The Last Homecoming (O teleftaios gyrismos) is a 2008 drama film written and directed by Cypriot director Corinna Avraamidou. It is Avraamidou's first feature film. The film  is set on Cyprus during the summer of 1974, when Turkey invaded Cyprus, and follows the romantic and political relations of a Greek Cypriot family.

Plot 

Orestes (Christodoulos Martas) and his fiancée Alexandra (Maria Kitsou) travel from Greece to Cyprus to visit Orestes's family in the summer of 1974. Orestes's brother Stefanos (Christopher Greco) and Alexandra, who are both involved in the Enosis movement become attracted to each other. When Stefanos is captured, Manolis (Stavros Louras), who still loves Stefanos' mother Phaedra (Popi Avraam), helps him escape the Kyrenia Castle, but is himself killed. The film ends with Orestes discovering Alexandra lying in Stefanos' arms, and the beginning of the Turkish invasion of Cyprus.

Awards 

The Last Homecoming won the award for Best Feature Film at the 2009 London Greek Film Festival.

Cast 
 Christodoulos Martas as Orestes
 Christopher Greco as Stefanos
 Maria Kitsou as Alexandra
 Popi Avraam as Phaedra
 Stavros Louras as Manolis

References

External links 
 
 

2000s Greek-language films
2008 drama films
2008 films
Cypriot drama films
Films set in Cyprus